The 28th Regiment "Pavia" is an active unit of the Italian Army based in Pesaro in the Marche region. Founded as 28th Infantry Regiment "Pavia" the regiment was part of the Italian army's infantry arm until it became the army's Psychological Operations unit on 1 March 2004 and has since then been designated a "multi-arms unit". The unit is assigned to the Tactical Intelligence Brigade.

History 
After the Second Italian War of Independence the Austrian Empire had to cede the Lombardy region of the Kingdom of Lombardy–Venetia to the Kingdom of Sardinia. After taking control of the region the government of Sardinia ordered the Royal Sardinian Army on 29 August 1859 to raise five infantry brigades and one grenadier brigade in Lombardy. Subsequently on 1 March 1860 the Brigade "Pavia" was activated with the newly raised 27th and 28th infantry regiments.

During the Third Italian War of Independence the 66th Infantry Regiment conquered Borgo and Levico on 23 July 1866. For this the King of Italy Victor Emmanuel II awarded the regiment Italy's highest military honor the Gold Medal of Military Valour.

World War I 
The Brigade "Pavia" fought on the Italian front in World War I. On 8 August 1916 the soldiers of the 28th Infantry Regiment were the first Italian troops to raise the Italian flag in the city of Gorizia. For this the King of Italy Victor Emmanuel III awarded the regiment Italy's second-highest military honor the Silver Medal of Military Valour.

On 20 October 1926 the Brigade "Pavia" assumed the name of XVII Infantry Brigade. The brigade was the infantry component of the 17th Territorial Division of Ravenna. On 27 April 1939 the division disbanded the XVII Infantry Brigade and changed its name to 27th Infantry Division "Pavia". The division consisted of the 26th Artillery Regiment "Pavia", 27th Infantry Regiment "Pavia" and 28th Infantry Regiment "Pavia".

World War II 

After the outbreak of World War II the Pavia was sent to Libya, where it was garrisoned in Sabratha west of Tripoli. The Pavia did not participate in the invasion of Egypt in September 1940 and remained in Tripolitania and was thus saved from destruction when the British Operation Compass swept across Cyrenaica.

In March 1941 the Pavia moved to Benghazi for the Axis Operation Sonnenblume offensive of March–April 1941 and from then on participated in all battles of the Western Desert Campaign until the division and its regiments were destroyed in the Second Battle of El Alamein in November 1942. For its conduct during the Siege of Tobruk the regiment was awarded its second Silver Medal of Military Valour.

Cold War 
On 1 July 1958 the 6th Recruits Training Center in Pesaro was renamed 28th Infantry Regiment "Pavia" (Recruits Training). The regiment consisted of three training battalions: the I Battalion in Pesaro, the II Battalion in Fano, and the III Battalion in Falconara Marittima.

With the 1975 army reform the Italian Army abolished the regimental level and battalions came under direct command of the brigades and regional commands. Therefore, on 15 November 1975, the 28th Infantry Regiment "Pavia" and its II and III Battalion were disbanded, while the regiment's I Battalion was renamed 28th Infantry Battalion "Pavia" (Recruits Training). The battalion was assigned the flag and traditions of the 28th Infantry Regiment "Pavia" and became the recruits training battalion of the Mechanized Division "Folgore".

In 1986 the Italian Army abolished the divisional level and so on 31 October 1986 the Mechanized Division "Folgore" was disbanded and the division's units assigned to the 5th Army Corps. On 17 September 1991 the battalion was provisionally renamed 28th Infantry Regiment "Pavia" and added a second battalion in Fano. On 17 September 1922 the 2nd Battalion in Fano was used to reform the 121st Infantry Regiment "Macerata". On 7 January 1993 the unit's elevation to 28th Regiment "Pavia" (Recruits Training) was confirmed.

Recent times 
In 2002 the regiment began to reorganize as a Psychological Operations (PsyOps) unit. On 14 February 2004 the regiment left the Italian Army's infantry arm and became a multi-arms unit. On 1 March 2004 the regiment became officially the Italian Army's PsyOps unit and was renamed 28th Regiment "Pavia" (Operational Communications).

On 1 September 2014 the regiment was assigned to the Army Special Forces Command. In 2022 the regiment was transferred to the Tactical Intelligence Brigade and renamed 28th Regiment "Pavia".

Structure 
As of 2022 the 28th Regiment "Pavia" consists of:

  Regimental Command, in Cassino
 Regimental Command
 Staff and Personnel Office
 Operations, Training and Information Office
 Logistic and Administrative Office
 Command and Logistic Support Company
 1st Battalion
 Internet & Print Company
 TV-Radio Company
 Distribution Company
 Operational Communications Planning and Development Center

The Command and Logistic Support Company fields the following platoons: C3 Platoon, Transport and Materiel Platoon, Medical Platoon, and Supply Platoon.

External links
Italian Army Website: 28° Reggimento Comunicazioni Operative "Pavia"

References

Infantry Regiments of Italy